Hayseed Timebomb is an album by the Kentucky-based cowpunk band Nine Pound Hammer, released in 1994. The band supported the album with 10-week tour.

"Wreck of the Old 97" is a cover of the Johnny Cash version of the song.

Critical reception

The Morning Call deemed the album "excellent," writing that "it takes a smart band to write painfully accurate songs such as 'Hayseed Timebomb', 'Stranded Outside Tater Knob' and 'Shotgun in a Chevy'." Trouser Press concluded that "the album’s trash-filled swamp of beer, No-Doz, junk food, sloppy sex and rifles blurs the us-them culture line in a hyped-up wail of droll debauchery." 

AllMusic wrote that the band "relies on their comical faux aggression to produce something of hyper-real consequence."

Track listing

Personnel
Bill Waldron – Drums
Scott Luallen – Vocals
Matt Bartholomy – Bass
Blaine Cartwright – Guitar

References

Nine Pound Hammer albums
1994 albums
Crypt Records albums